Bayanaul Range is a range of mountains in Bayanaul District, Pavlodar Region, Kazakhstan.

Bayanaul, the administrative center of Bayanaul District, lies at the feet of the eastern slopes of the mountains. A large sector of the range is part of the Bayanaul National Park, a  protected area established in 1985.

Geography 
The Bayanaul Range is one of the subranges of the Kazakh Upland system (Saryarka). It rises in the northeastern sector of the highlands. The uppermost levels of the mountains are generally rocky and their slopes are deeply dissected by valleys and ravines. No major rivers have their sources in the range. Most flow into the surrounding steppe, their waters ending up in distant salt lakes or dispersed in the sands.

The main lakes in the range are Sabyndykol, the largest one, as well as Zhasybai, Toraigyr and Byrzhankol, the latter located in the western part of the range. There are also numerous rock formations within the mountain area.

Flora
Below the rocky summits the slopes are covered by forests where larch and birch predominate. There is as well steppe vegetation made up of coarse feathergrass and forb grassland areas.

See also
Geography of Kazakhstan

References

External links

Visit Kazakhstan
Kazakh Uplands

ru:Баянаульские горы